Frederick Clive Inskip (24 October 1924 – 2000) was an English professional footballer who played as a winger in the Football League for Crewe Alexandra.

Inskip was on the books at Nottingham Forest during the war years but failed to register an appearance. He signed as a guest for one game for Colchester United in 1945, before joining Crewe Alexandra in 1948, where he made 26 Football League appearances. He later played for Stafford Rangers.

Career
Born in Cheadle, Staffordshire, Inskip began his footballing career with Nottingham Forest but never made a first-team appearance for the club. He joined Southern League side Colchester United for one game as a guest in 1945, playing in their 4–1 Layer Road defeat by Bedford Town on 29 September.

By April 1948, Inskip had made a move to Crewe Alexandra, where he made his Football League debut. He made 26 league appearances for Crewe, scoring four goals. After this, he played for Stafford Rangers.

References

1924 births
2000 deaths
People from Cheadle, Staffordshire
Association football wingers
English footballers
Nottingham Forest F.C. players
Colchester United F.C. players
Crewe Alexandra F.C. players
Stafford Rangers F.C. players
English Football League players
Southern Football League players